The Merchant: Gaekju 2015 (lit. "Master of Trade: The Innkeeper Merchant 2015") is a South Korean television series based on Gaekju, Kim Joo-young's ten-volume novel which was serialized in daily newspaper Seoul Shinmun from June 1979 to February 1983. It aired on KBS2 on Wednesdays and Thursdays at 21:55 for 41 episodes beginning September 23, 2015.

Plot
In late Joseon, a poor man named Chun Bong-sam inherits a decrepit inn and honestly works his way up to becoming a powerful merchant. As tradesmen clash against the bureaucratic powers that attempt to oppress them by rigging bad deals, Bong-sam never loses sight of his humble beginnings as a peddler even after achieving great success and eventually shapes the way that industry and business are done in his time.

Cast
Jang Hyuk as Chun Bong-sam
 Jo Hyun-do as young Bong-sam
Yu Oh-seong as Gil So-gae
 Park Gun-tae as young So-gae
Kim Min-jung as Mae-wol
Han Chae-ah as Jo So-sa
Park Eun-hye as Chun So-rye
Seo Ji-hee as young So-rye
Lee Deok-hwa as Shin Seok-ju
Kim Il-woo as Maeng Gu-beom
Kim Kyu-chul as Kim Bo-hyun
Kim Hak-chul as Kim Hak-joon
Jung Tae-woo as Sun-dol
Ryu Dam as Gom-bae
Yang Jung-a as Bang-geum
Song Young-jae as Mung-gae
Moon Ga-young as Wol-yi
Choi Seung-hoon

Original soundtracks

Ratings 
In the table below, the blue numbers represent the lowest ratings and the red numbers represent the highest ratings.

Awards and nominations

International broadcast

References

External links
  
 
 

Korean Broadcasting System television dramas
2015 South Korean television series debuts
2015 South Korean television series endings
South Korean historical television series
Television series set in the Joseon dynasty
Television series by SM C&C
Television shows based on South Korean novels